Roderick Rashaun Cartwright (born December 3, 1979) is a former American football running back in the National Football League (NFL). He was named Offensive Quality Control coach of the Cleveland Browns in February 2016. He was drafted by the Washington Redskins in the seventh round of the 2002 NFL Draft. He played college football at Kansas State. Cartwright was also a member of the Oakland Raiders and San Francisco 49ers.

Early years
Cartwright attended Conroe High School in Conroe, Texas, and lettered in football, track and field, and baseball.  During his senior year, Cartwright rushed for 2,060 yards and was named a Parade All-American.

College career
Cartwright played college football at Kansas State University at the fullback position after transferring from Trinity Valley Community College in Athens, Texas.

Professional career

Washington Redskins
Cartwright was drafted in the seventh round of the 2002 NFL Draft by the Redskins. In 2006, he broke the Redskins' single-season kickoff return yards record with 64 returns for 1,541 yards - a record which had been previously held by Brian Mitchell since 1994. He also received his first kickoff return for a touchdown in 2006 against the Dallas Cowboys. In 2007, he was ranked second in the NFC in kickoff returns. He was released on March 4, 2010.

Oakland Raiders
Cartwright signed with the Oakland Raiders on April 26, 2010.

San Francisco 49ers
Carwright signed with the San Francisco 49ers on March 15, 2012.  He was released on August 31, 2012.

Coaching career
Cartwright was signed as an offensive quality control coach of the Cleveland Browns in 2016.

References

1979 births
Living people
People from Conroe, Texas
Players of American football from Texas
American football running backs
American football return specialists
Trinity Valley Cardinals football players
Kansas State Wildcats football players
Washington Redskins players
Oakland Raiders players
San Francisco 49ers players
Conroe High School alumni